Anna-Karin Olsson (born 10 May 1967) is a Swedish former professional tennis and bandy player.

Biography
Olsson grew up in Värmland.

As a tennis player, Olsson competed on the professional tour in the 1980s and had a best singles ranking of 248. She was most successful as a doubles player, reaching the final of the 1988 Spanish Open and featuring in the main draw of both the French Open and US Open that year.

She played bandy as a forward and started her career at IF Boltic, where she remained until 1989. From 1989 from 2004 she played for AIK and was a member of eight championship winning AIK teams, giving her a record 12 titles in total, having won four while at IF Boltic. She was the league's top shooter in 1998, 1999 and 2001. In 2016 she was inducted into the Swedish Bandy Hall of Fame.

WTA Tour finals

Doubles (0–1)

ITF finals

Singles (1–1)

Doubles (1-2)

References

External links
 
 

1967 births
Living people
Swedish female tennis players
Swedish bandy players
People from Kil Municipality
Sportspeople from Värmland County
20th-century Swedish women